Holy Cross High School is a school in the Western Cape.

External links
 

Schools in Cape Town